Pascal Massart (born 23 January 1958) is a French Statistician.

His work focuses on probability and statistics, notably the Dvoretzky–Kiefer–Wolfowitz inequality, the Bousquet inequality, the concentration inequality, and the Efron-Stein inequality. With Lucien Birgé he worked on model selection.

He received his Ph.D. in statistics from Paris-Sud University under Jean Bretagnolle. He has worked at the University of Paris-Sud and at the University of Lyon.

Honors and awards
He was awarded the COPSS Presidents' Award in 1998. He was awarded the Prix Pierre-Simon de Laplace from the French Statistical Society in 2007 alongside Paul Deheuvels. He was a lecturer at the European Congress of Mathematics in 2004 in Stockholm.

Books
 Concentration Inequalities: A Nonasymptotic Theory of Independence (2013)
 Concentration Inequalities and Model Selection (2003)

References

External links
 Official website

Living people
French statisticians
1958 births
Paris-Sud University alumni
Academic staff of Paris-Sud University